Igor Beribak (born May 18, 1964) is a former Yugoslav ice hockey player. He played for the Yugoslavia men's national ice hockey team at the 1984 Winter Olympics in Sarajevo, and the Slovenia men's national ice hockey team at the 2002 world championships.

References

External links

1964 births
Living people
HDD Olimpija Ljubljana players
KHK Red Star players
KHL Medveščak Zagreb players
Ice hockey players at the 1984 Winter Olympics
Olympic ice hockey players of Yugoslavia
HK Slavija Ljubljana players
Slovenian ice hockey defencemen
Sportspeople from Ljubljana
Yugoslav ice hockey defencemen